Lucien Shaw (March 1, 1845 – March 19, 1933) was the 18th Chief Justice of California and a prominent Republican politician in California during the early 20th century.

Biography
Shaw was born on a farm in Vevay, Switzerland County, Indiana, and attended public schools. Shaw studied for one year at the Indianapolis Law College, graduating in March 1869.

After graduation, Shaw engaged in private practice in Greene County, Indiana. In December 1883, he moved to Los Angeles and then Fresno for two years. In October 1885, he was admitted to the California bar. In September 1887, Shaw became a director of the county law library. Shaw maintained law firms first in Fresno and then, after 1886, in Los Angeles with J. M. Damron in Shaw & Damron. Shaw's partner was elected to the State Assembly, and put forward Shaw's name for appointment to the bench. In March 1889, Governor Robert Waterman appointed Shaw to a new seat on the Los Angeles County Superior Court. On the trial bench, Shaw served with future Supreme Court justice Walter Van Dyke. The following year, in November 1890, Shaw ran and won election for a term of six years. In 1896, he was re-elected to another six-year term to the Superior Court.

In November 1902, Shaw was elected after a nomination by the Republican Party to fill an open seat as an Associate Justice of the Supreme Court of California. At the same time, Frank M. Angellotti was elected on the Republican ticket. In November 1914, Shaw was re-elected to another 12-year term. In January 1915, Angellotti became Chief Justice, serving six years until resigning to resume private practice in November 1921. To fill the position, Governor William Stephens appointed Shaw as Chief Justice, and he was sworn in on November 15, 1921. He held the seat until expiration of his term in January 1923, when he stepped down. Shaw was an expert in water law, and his notable cases include Palmer v. The Railroad Commission (1914), Duckworth v. Watsonville Water Company (1915), and Katz v. Walkinshaw (1903), concerning the rights of common users of aquifers.

After Shaw retired from the court, he engaged in private practice and joined the Pacific Mutual Life Insurance Company's Board of Directors. In 1922, he received an honorary LL.D. from the University of California, Berkeley.

Personal life
On July 29, 1873, Shaw married Hannah J. Hartley, in Raisin City, Michigan, and they had one child. Shaw resided in Hermosa Beach, California, and died on March 19, 1933 in Glendale, California. Shaw's son, Hartley, was a judge on the Los Angeles Superior Court from 1923.

References

External links
 Lucien Shaw In Memoriam, 220 Cal. Rpts. 781 (1933). California Supreme Court Historical Society.
 Grace, Roger M. (June 10, 2005). "LACBA’s Republican Caucus Makes Endorsements", Met News. Article discussing Lucien Shaw.
 Opinions authored by Lucien Shaw. Courtlistener.com.
 Past & Present Justices. California State Courts. Retrieved July 19, 2017.

See also
 List of justices of the Supreme Court of California

1845 births
1933 deaths
Chief Justices of California
California Republicans
Justices of the Supreme Court of California
20th-century American judges
Superior court judges in the United States
20th-century American lawyers
Lawyers from Los Angeles
U.S. state supreme court judges admitted to the practice of law by reading law